Glenn Moniz (born September 8, 1944) is an American politician and a Republican member of the Wyoming Senate representing District 10 since January 10, 2017.

Elections

2008
When incumbent Republican Representative James Slater retired and left the District 46 seat open, Moniz ran unopposed for the Republican nomination He won the general election with 2,513 votes (48.6%) against Democratic nominee Jim Thompson.

2010 
Moniz ran unopposed in both the Republican primary and the general election.

2012 
Moniz ran unopposed in the Republican primary, winning with 929 votes. He won the general election with 56% of the vote against Democratic nominee Kennedy Penn-O'Toole.

2014
Moniz ran unopposed in the Republican primary and defeated Democratic candidate Mike Selmer in the general election, winning 54% of the vote.

2016
When incumbent Republican State Senate President Phil Nicholas retired, Moniz ran unopposed in the Republican primary. He defeated Democratic nominee Narina Nunez with 57% of the vote.

References

External links
Official page at the Wyoming Legislature
 

1944 births
Living people
Republican Party members of the Wyoming House of Representatives
Politicians from Laramie, Wyoming
21st-century American politicians